Juan Cruz Real (born 8 October 1976) is a former Argentine footballer, currently manager. He had numerous stints in South American leagues, and finished off his career in the Canadian Professional Soccer League.

Playing career 
Real began his career in his native country with Argentinian giants Independiente. In 1997, he signed with Deportivo Español, and the following season he went to Colombia to play for Millonarios F.C. In 1999, he returned to Argentina to sign with Arsenal de Sarandí. Soon after he featured in the lower Argentinian leagues with Independiente Rivadavia, and Almirante Brown de Arrecifes, winning the Torneo Argentino A in 1999. Cruz Real had a stint overseas in the island of Haiti with Roulado in 2002, and returning to the South American continent in 2003 with Unión San Felipe of Chile.

In 2004, he went once more overseas to Canada to sign with the Brampton Hitmen of the Canadian Professional Soccer League. He made his debut for the club on September 10, 2004 in a match against Toronto Supra. He helped Brampton secure a post-season berth by finishing fourth in the Western Conference. He featured in the wildcard playoff match against Toronto Croatia, but were eliminated by a score of 3-1.

The following year he signed with division rivals Hamilton Thunder. His achievements with Hamilton were clinching the division title, and qualifying for the post-season. He featured in the semifinal playoff match against Oakville Blue Devils, but lost by a score of 2-0. In 2009, he had a stint with North York Astros in the Canadian Soccer League.

References

External links
 
 
 Profile at Futbol XXI Profile a  
 

1976 births
Living people
Argentine footballers
Argentine expatriate footballers
Club Atlético Independiente footballers
Independiente Rivadavia footballers
Arsenal de Sarandí footballers
Unión San Felipe footballers
Chilean Primera División players
Argentine Primera División players
Expatriate footballers in Chile
Expatriate footballers in Haiti
Expatriate soccer players in Canada
Ligue Haïtienne players
Brampton Stallions (Hitmen) players
Hamilton Thunder players
North York Astros players
Canadian Soccer League (1998–present) players
Association football midfielders
Expatriate footballers in Colombia
Deportivo Español footballers
Millonarios F.C. players
Almirante Brown de Arrecifes players
Argentine football managers
Argentine expatriate football managers
Expatriate football managers in Costa Rica
Expatriate football managers in Venezuela
Expatriate football managers in Colombia
Estudiantes de Mérida managers
Jaguares de Córdoba managers
Olimpo managers
América de Cali managers
Atlético Junior managers
People from Tandil
Sportspeople from Buenos Aires Province